The Hino 600 (also known as the 165, 175, 185, 268, 338 and 358 nameplates, and as the 'L Series' since the 2021 model year) is a conventional cab medium-duty truck manufactured since 2004 in the US by Hino.

First generation (2004)
The first-generation 600 was introduced in 2004 for the United States and in 2005 for the Canadian market to replace the fourth generation F-Series cabover. A new face-lifted 600 was introduced in 2007 for both the American and Canadian markets. Some CKD kits have been imported from Japan. Class 4 and 5 models were replaced by the Hino 155 and 195 in 2012.

Models:

145 Class 4 - light duty truck (discontinued)
165 Class 4 - medium duty truck (discontinued)
185 Class 5 - medium duty truck (discontinued)
238 Class 6 - medium duty truck
258 Class 6 - medium duty truck
268 Class 6 - medium duty truck
308 Class 7 - heavy duty truck (discontinued)
338 Class 7 - heavy duty truck
358 Class 7 - heavy duty truck

Hino L series (2021) 
The redesigned 2021 model was announced on October 28, 2019. Thus, it was officially renamed the L series, coinciding the launch of larger Class 7 and 8 XL series, and the smaller Class 4 and 5 M series.

The L series' exterior design features new headlamps, and a stylish bumper. The interior also features a 4-spoke steering wheel, a 7-inch Multi Information Display (MID) and a selection of options.

Carryover diesel engines has been remain unchanged.

References

External links

Hino 165 Information

Hino Motors vehicles
Vehicles introduced in 2004